Dogwalk is an unincorporated community in Ohio County, Kentucky, in the United States.

Dogwalk has been noted for its unusual place name.

References

Unincorporated communities in Ohio County, Kentucky
Unincorporated communities in Kentucky